Hinopak Motors is a Pakistani truck and bus manufacturer based in Karachi, Pakistan. It is the largest bus and truck manufacturer in Pakistan and the authorized assembler and manufacturer of Hino vehicles since 1985 at its assembly plant at S.I.T.E Industrial Area.

History
Hinopak was formed in 1985 by Hino Motors, Toyota Tsusho, Al-Futtaim Group and PACO. In 1998, Hino Motors, and Toyota Tsusho Corporation obtained majority shareholding in the company after disinvestments by the other two founding investors. Hinopak Motors has a 70% market share in Pakistan, and gained its highest-ever after-tax profit in FY~2018-19.

Operations in Pakistan 
In 2021, HinoPak Motors signed a solar power purchase agreement with UAE-based solar energy company, Yellow Door Energy. The agreement aimed to reduce the company's reliance on grid power and offset approximately 15% of its energy consumption. Yellow Door Energy installed a 4.4 MW solar power system at HinoPak Motors' manufacturing plant in Karachi, which is expected to generate 6.8 million kWh of clean energy annually and reduce carbon emissions by approximately 5,200 tons per year. HinoPak Motors' sustainability efforts include reducing its carbon footprint and increasing energy efficiency.   

Later in 2021, HinoPak announced a profit of Rs. 358 million. This is a significant improvement compared to the previous year when the company reported a loss of Rs. 713 million. The positive results were attributed to increased sales volume and improved operational efficiency.

Products

Buses
 Hino Skyliner
 Hino Starliner
 Hino Superliner
 Hino Kazay
 RN8JSKA (Bus chassis)
 AK8J (Bus chassis)

Trucks

300 series/Hino Dutro
WU 640
WU 720

500 series/Hino Ranger
 Hino FG8J 4X2 
 Hino FL8J 6x2 
 Hino FM8J 6X4

Prime movers
 Hino FG8J 4X2 
 Hino FM8J 6X4 
 Hino FM2P 6x4

CSR
HinoPak Motors manages a school under the Pakistan Corporate Social Responsibility Program.

See also
 Hino Motors

References

External links
 Official Hinopak Motors Limited website

Bus manufacturers of Pakistan
Truck manufacturers of Pakistan
Manufacturing companies based in Karachi
Vehicle manufacturing companies established in 1985
Pakistani companies established in 1985
Toyota brands and marques
Pakistani subsidiaries of foreign companies